Rob Selby is a former professional American football player who played offensive lineman in the National Football League for seven seasons. He was drafted by the Philadelphia Eagles in the third round of the 1991 NFL Draft. He played for Philadelphia for four seasons from 1991 to 1994. He also played for the Arizona Cardinals from 1995 to 1997. He played college football for Auburn.

References

1967 births
Players of American football from Birmingham, Alabama
American football offensive guards
American football offensive tackles
Arizona Cardinals players
Philadelphia Eagles players
Auburn Tigers football players
Living people